Spodnji Gaj pri Pragerskem is a small settlement just east of Pragersko in northeastern Slovenia. It belongs to the Municipality of Kidričevo. The area is part of the traditional region of Styria. It is now included with the rest of the municipality in the Drava Statistical Region.

History
The settlement was split off from Gaj in the neighboring Municipality of Slovenska Bistrica in 1980 and named Spodnji Gaj pri Pragerskem.

References

External links
Spodnji Gaj pri Pragerskem on Geopedia

Populated places in the Municipality of Kidričevo